NIST Special Publication 800-53 provides a catalog of security and privacy controls for all U.S. federal information systems except those related to national security. It is published by the National Institute of Standards and Technology, which is a non-regulatory agency of the United States Department of Commerce. NIST develops and issues standards, guidelines, and other publications to assist federal agencies in implementing the Federal Information Security Modernization Act of 2014 (FISMA) and to help with managing cost effective programs to protect their information and information systems.

Two related documents are 800-53A and 800-53B which provide guidance, and baselines based on 800-53.

Purpose
NIST Special Publication 800-53 is part of the Special Publication 800-series that reports on the Information Technology Laboratory's (ITL) research, guidelines, and outreach efforts in information system security, and on ITL's activity with industry, government, and academic organizations.

Specifically, NIST Special Publication 800-53 covers the steps in the Risk Management Framework that address security control selection for federal information systems in accordance with the security requirements in Federal Information Processing Standard (FIPS) 200.  This includes selecting an initial set of baseline security controls based on a FIPS 199 worst-case impact analysis, tailoring the baseline security controls, and supplementing the security controls based on an organizational assessment of risk. The security rules cover 20 areas including access control, incident response, business continuity, and disaster recovery.

A key part of the assessment and authorization (formerly certification and accreditation) process for federal information systems is selecting and implementing a subset of the controls (safeguards) from the Security Control Catalog (NIST 800-53, Appendix F) . These controls are the management, operational, and technical safeguards (or countermeasures) prescribed for an information system to protect the confidentiality, integrity, and availability of the system and its information.  To implement the needed safeguards or controls, agencies must first determine the security category of their information systems in accordance with the provisions of FIPS 199, “Standards for Security Categorization of Federal Information and Information Systems.”  The security categorization of the information system (low, moderate or high) determines the baseline collection of controls that must be implemented and monitored. Agencies have the ability to adjust these controls and tailor them to fit more closely with their organizational goals or environments.

Compliance

Although any private organization can adopt the use of NIST 800-53 as a guiding framework for their security practice, all U.S. federal government agencies and contractors are required to comply with the framework in order to protect their critical data.

Agencies are expected to be compliant with NIST security standards and guidelines within one year of the publication date (February 2005) unless otherwise directed.  Information systems that are under development are expected to be compliant upon deployment.

Revisions

Initial release 
NIST Special Publication 800-53 was initially released in February 2005 as "Recommended Security Controls for Federal Information Systems."

First revision 
NIST Special Publication 800-53 Revision 1 was initially released in December 2006 as "Recommended Security Controls for Federal Information Systems."

Second revision 
NIST Special Publication 800-53 Revision 2 was initially released in December 2007 as "Recommended Security Controls for Federal Information Systems."

Third revision
The third version of NIST's Special Publication 800-53, "Recommended Security Controls for Federal Information Systems and Organizations," incorporates several recommendations from people who commented on previously published versions, who recommended a reduction in the number of security controls for low-impact systems, a new set of application-level controls and greater discretionary powers for organizations to downgrade controls.  Also included in the final draft is language that allows federal agencies to keep their existing security measures if they can demonstrate that the level of security is equivalent to the standards being proposed by NIST. The third version also represents an effort to harmonize security requirements across government communities and between government and non-government systems. In the past, NIST guidance has not applied to government information systems identified as national security systems.  The management, operational, and technical controls in SP 800-53 Revision 3 provide a common information security language for all government information systems. The revised security control catalog also includes state-of-the-practice safeguards and countermeasures to address advanced cyber threats and exploits. Significant changes in this revision of the document include
 A simplified, six-step risk management framework;
 Additional security controls and enhancements for advanced cyber threats;
 Recommendations for prioritizing security controls during implementation or deployment;
 Revised security control structure with a new references section;
 Elimination of security requirements from supplemental guidance sections;
 Guidance on using the risk management framework for legacy information systems and for external information system services providers;
 Updates to security control baselines based on current threat information and cyber attacks;
 Organization-level security controls for managing information security programs;
 Guidance on the management of common controls within organizations; and
 Strategy for harmonizing FISMA security standards and guidelines with international security standard ISO/IEC 27001.

Fourth revision
As part of the ongoing cyber security partnership among the United States Department of Defense, the intelligence community, and the federal civil agencies, NIST has launched its biennial update to Special Publication 800‐53, "Security and Privacy Controls for Federal Information Systems and Organizations," with an initial public draft released on February 28, 2012. The 2011–12 initiative will include an update of current security controls, control enhancements, supplemental guidance and an update on tailoring and supplementation guidance that form key elements of the control selection process. Key focus areas include, but are not limited to:
 Insider threats;
 Software application security (including web applications);
 Social networking, mobiles devices, and cloud computing;
 Cross domain solutions;
 Advanced persistent threats;
 Supply chain security;
 Privacy.

Revision 4 is broken up into 18 control families, including:
 AC - Access Control
 AU - Audit and Accountability
 AT - Awareness and Training
 CM - Configuration Management
 CP - Contingency Planning
 IA - Identification and Authentication
 IR - Incident Response
 MA - Maintenance
 MP - Media Protection
 PS - Personnel Security
 PE - Physical and Environmental Protection
 PL - Planning
 PM - Program Management
 RA - Risk Assessment
 CA - Security Assessment and Authorization
 SC - System and Communications Protection
 SI - System and Information Integrity
 SA - System and Services Acquisition

Information on these control families and the controls contained within can be found on the NIST website at the following link: https://nvd.nist.gov/800-53/Rev4

Fifth revision 
NIST SP 800-53 Revision 5 removes the word "federal" to indicate that these regulations may be applied to all organizations, not just federal organizations. The first public draft was published on August 15, 2017. A final draft release was set for publication in December 2018, with the final publication date set for March 2019." Per the NIST Computer Security Resource Center (CSRC), major changes to the publication include:
 
 Making the security and privacy controls more outcome-based by changing the structure of the controls;
 Fully integrating the privacy controls into the security control catalog creating a consolidated and unified set of controls for systems and organizations;
 Separating the control selection process from the actual controls, thus allowing the controls to be used by different communities of interest including systems engineers, software developers, enterprise architects; and mission/business owners;
 Eliminating the term information system and replacing it with the term system so the controls can be applied to any type of system including, for example, general-purpose systems, cyber-physical systems, industrial/process control systems, and IoT devices;
 De-emphasizing the federal focus of the publication to encourage greater use by nonfederal organizations;
 Promoting integration with different risk management and cyber security approaches and lexicons, including the Cybersecurity Framework;
 Clarifying the relationship between security and privacy to improve the selection of controls necessary to address the full scope of security and privacy risks; and
 Incorporating new, state of the practice controls based on threat intelligence and empirical attack data, including controls to strengthen cybersecurity and privacy governance and accountability.

, Revision 5 was delayed due to a potential disagreement among the Office of Information and Regulatory Affairs (OIRA) and other U.S. agencies.

The final version of Revision 5 was released on September 23, 2020 and is available on the NIST website at the following link: https://csrc.nist.gov/publications/detail/sp/800-53/rev-5/final

800-53A 

NIST Special Publication 800-53A provides a set of procedures for conducting assessments of security controls and privacy controls employed within federal information systems and organizations. The procedures are customizable and can be easily tailored to provide organizations with the needed flexibility to conduct security control assessments and privacy control assessments that support organizational risk management processes and that are aligned with the stated risk tolerance of the organization. Information on building effective security assessment plans and privacy assessment plans is also provided along with guidance on analyzing assessment results.

Revision 1 
NIST Special Publication 800-53A is titled “Guide for Assessing Security Controls in Federal Information Systems and Organizations."  This version will describe testing and evaluation procedures for the 17 required control families.  These assessment guidelines are designed to enable periodic testing and are used by federal agencies to determine what security controls are necessary to protect organizational operations and assets, individuals, other organizations, and the nation.
According to Ron Ross, senior computer scientist and information security researcher at NIST, these guidelines will also allow federal agencies to assess "if mandated controls have been implemented correctly, are operating as intended, and are... meeting the organization's security requirements."

To do this, version A describes assessment methods and procedures for each of the security controls mandated in Special Publication 800-53. These methods and procedures are to be used as guidelines for federal agencies.  These guidelines are meant to limit confusion and ensure that agencies interpret and implement the security controls in the same way.

Revision 4 
NIST SP 800-53A Revision 4 is Assessing Security and Privacy Controls in Federal Information Systems and Organizations. The Revision number went from Revision 1 to Revision 4 in order to better reflect the NIST Special Publication 800-53 it is meant to be used with.

800-53B 

NIST Special Publication 800-53B provides a set of baseline security controls and privacy controls for information systems and organizations. The baselines establish default controls based on FISMA rates (Privacy, Low, Moderate, and High) and can be easily tailored to organizational risk management processes.

Information on building effective security assessment plans and privacy assessment plans is also provided along with guidance on analyzing assessment results.

Initial release 
NIST Special Publication 800-53B was initially released in September 2020 as "Control Baselines for Information Systems and Organizations."

References

External links
 List of all NIST 800 series Special Publications
 NIST Special Publication 800-53, Revision 4
 NIST Special Publication 800-37 Guide for Applying the Risk Management Framework to Federal Information Systems

Information assurance standards
National Institute of Standards and Technology